Şirvan Şamaxı FK was an Azerbaijani football club from Şamaxı founded in 1990, as İnşaatçı Şamaxı. They changed their name to Şirvan Şamaxı in 1992 for their only Azerbaijan Top Division season, in which they finished 20th and were relegated to the Azerbaijan First Division, and dissolved two years later at the end of the 1993–94 season.

League and domestic cup history

References 

Sirvan Samaxi
Association football clubs established in 1990
Defunct football clubs in Azerbaijan
Association football clubs disestablished in 1994